Timothy Andrew Moura (born March 17, 1983), better known by the ring name Timothy Thatcher, is an American professional wrestler and catch wrestler currently performing for Pro-Wrestling NOAH. He was previously signed to WWE, where he performed on the NXT brand.

Thatcher is best known for his work in Evolve, where he is the longest-reigning Evolve Champion, as well as a former (and final) Open the Freedom Gate Champion and the 2014 Style Battle Tournament winner. In addition to his work for WWNLive promotions, Thatcher has worked internationally for numerous notable promotions, including Major League Wrestling (MLW), Pro Wrestling Guerrilla (PWG), Progress Wrestling, Revolution Pro Wrestling (RevPro), Preston City Wrestling (PCW), Westside Xtreme Wrestling (wXw) and, Combat Zone Wrestling (CZW).

Thatcher is the second and final man (after Drew Galloway) to simultaneously hold the Evolve and Open The Freedom Gate Championships.

Professional wrestling career

Early years 
Moura made his pro wrestling debut in September 2005 for Supreme Pro Wrestling in a match lost against Drake Smith. Between the names Tim Moura and Timothy Thatcher, he appeared in promotions including Supreme Pro Wrestling, All Pro Wrestling (APW), Pro Wrestling Bushido, Championship Wrestling from Hollywood (CWFH) and Pro Wrestling Guerrilla (PWG) among others. Thatcher would later work for Insane Championship Wrestling (ICW) and Source Wrestling, Preston City Wrestling (PCW), Progress Wrestling (Progress), Southside Wrestling Entertainment (SWE), and Westside Xtreme Wrestling (wXw), where he is a former Unified World Wrestling Champion and World Tag Team Champion. Thatcher became a Triple Crown Champion in Supreme Pro Wrestling, winning the SPW Extreme Championship, Heavyweight Championship and Tag Team Championship. While in All Pro Wrestling, Thatcher became a two-time APW Universal Heavyweight Champion and a two-time APW Worldwide Internet Champion.

Westside Xtreme Wrestling (2013–2019) 
Thatcher debuted in 2013 during Westside Xtreme Wrestling (wXw)'s Ambition 4 tournament, in a quarter final match lost against Heddi Karaoui. The following night, he also competed in wXw's Back To The Roots XII event, losing in a singles match against Axel Dieter Jr. During his tenure in wXw, Thatcher became a one-time wXw World Tag Team Champion with Walter, and a one-time wXw Unified World Wrestling Champion.

Evolve (2014–2019) 
Thatcher made his Evolve debut at Evolve 31 in a Round Robin Challenge, losing to Drew Gulak. At Evolve 45, Thatcher became a double-champion, winning both the Open the Freedom Gate Championship and the Evolve Championship. Thatcher was the longest reigning Evolve Champion in history until he lost to Zack Sabre Jr. on February 25, 2017, at Evolve 79, ending his reign at 596 days.

WWE (2020–2022) 
On February 2, 2020, it was reported Thatcher signed a developmental contract with WWE. On the April 15 edition of NXT, Thatcher was revealed as Matt Riddle's tag team partner, replacing Pete Dunne (who was unable to travel due to the COVID-19 pandemic). Thatcher and Riddle defended the NXT Tag Team Championships against Undisputed Era. However, on the May 13 edition of NXT, Thatcher and Riddle lost the titles to Imperium when Thatcher walked out on Riddle during the match, turning heel in the process. Thatcher would then face Riddle later on in the evening, with Riddle picking up the win. Following the match, Thatcher would attack Riddle and lock him in his Fujiwara armbar submission. Their storyline would end the following week in a Fight Pit match with Kurt Angle as the special guest referee, where Thatcher won after Riddle passed out to a rear naked choke. On the June 17 episode of NXT, he debuted a new gimmick of a submission specialist who teaches new students his "Thatch-as-Thatch-Can" style of training. On the September 16 episode of NXT, Thatcher had his first singles championship match in WWE when he faced Damian Priest for the NXT North American Championship where he was unsuccessful. At NXT TakeOver XXX, he had his first Takeover match where he lost to Finn Balor. Shortly after, he began a feud with Tommaso Ciampa which led to a match at NXT TakeOver War Games where Ciampa won. On the January 20, 2021, episode of NXT, Thatcher fought Ciampa in the Fight Pit where he came out victorious. After the match, Thatcher and Ciampa showed respect to one another and Ciampa asked Thatcher to be his partner for the Dusty Rhodes Tag Team Classic which Thatcher accepted, turning face in the process. They defeated Ariya Daivari and Tony Nese in the first round, The Undisputed Era (Adam Cole and Roderick Strong), in the quarter finals, before being defeated by the Grizzled Young Veterans in the semi-finals. On the June 15 episode of NXT, Ciampa and Thatcher defeated the Grizzled Young Veterans in a tornado tag match to earn a future NXT Tag Team Championship match. They faced the champions, MSK on July 6 at The Great American Bash but were defeated. On the August 24 episode of NXT, Thatcher faced Ridge Holland in a losing effort and after the match would be brutally attacked by Holland, writing him off television. This would mark his final appearance on television as he would transition to a coaching role at the WWE Performance Center. On January 5, 2022, Thatcher was released from his WWE contract.

Pro Wrestling Noah (2022–present) 
On June 7, 2022, Thatcher made his debut in Pro Wrestling Noah (Noah) teaming with Sugiura-gun members El Hijo del Dr. Wagner Jr., Hideki Suzuki, Rene Dupree and Takashi Sugiura, subsequently becoming the newest member of the stable. The next day, he defeated Shuhei Taniguchi in his first singles match for Noah. On July 16, Thatcher won the vacant GHC Tag Team Championship with Suzuki, defeating Masa Kitamiya and Yoshiki Inamura. They would lose their titles to Takashi Sugiura and Satoshi Kojima on September 25, ending their reign at 71 days. On October 11, He would face Kaito Kiyomiya for the GHC Heavyweight Championship, in a losing effort.

All Elite Wrestling (2023) 
Thatcher made his All Elite Wrestling (AEW) debut on February 1, 2023, facing off against Bryan Danielson on AEW Dynamite after being (kayfabe) contracted by MJF, where he was unsuccessful.

Personal life
Moura is known for being very quiet about his personal life. He has no social media profiles and prefers to maintain a low profile.

Other media
Thatcher made his video game debut as a playable character in WWE 2K22.

Championships and accomplishments 
 All Pro Wrestling
 APW Universal Heavyweight Championship (2 times)
 APW Worldwide Internet Championship (2 times)
 Championship Wrestling from Hollywood
 CWFH Heritage Tag Team Championship (1 time) – with Drew Gulak
 UWN Tag Team Championship (1 time, inaugural) – with Drew Gulak
 DDT Pro-Wrestling
 Ironman Heavymetalweight Championship (1 time)
 Evolve
 Evolve Championship (1 time)
 Open the Freedom Gate Championship (1 time)
 Style Battle Tournament (2014)
Pacific Northwest Wrestling
 Pacific Northwest Light Heavyweight Championship (1 time)
 Pro Wrestling Bushido
 PWB Heavyweight Championship (1 time)
 Pro Wrestling Illustrated
 Ranked No. 71 of the best 500 singles wrestlers in the PWI 500 in 2016
Pro Wrestling Noah
GHC Tag Team Championship (1 time) – with Hideki Suzuki
 Supreme Pro Wrestling
 SPW Heavyweight Championship (1 time)
 SPW Extreme Championship (1 time)
 SPW Tag Team Championship (1 time) – with Drake Frost
 Westside Xtreme Wrestling
 wXw Unified World Wrestling Championship (1 time)
 wXw World Tag Team Championship (1 time) – with Walter
Ambition 9 (2018)
 Road to 16 Carat Gold Tournament (2016)
 World Tag Team League (2017) – with Walter
 Shortcut to the Top (2019)

References

External links
 
 
 

1983 births
Living people
21st-century professional wrestlers
American male professional wrestlers
Professional wrestlers from California
Sportspeople from Sacramento, California
Sportspeople from Alameda County, California
American people of Portuguese descent
American people of English descent
American catch wrestlers
GHC Tag Team Champions
Ironman Heavymetalweight Champions